The Austin Thunder was an American soccer club based in Austin, Texas that was a member of the Lone Star Soccer Alliance.

Year-by-year

References

Defunct soccer clubs in Texas
Lone Star Soccer Alliance teams
1987 establishments in Texas
1992 establishments in Texas
Association football clubs established in 1987
Association football clubs disestablished in 1992
Sports in Austin, Texas